Scott E. Hudson is a professor in the Human-Computer Interaction Institute at Carnegie Mellon University.  He was previously an associate professor in the College of Computing at the Georgia Institute of Technology, and prior to that, an assistant professor of computer science at the University of Arizona. He earned his Ph.D. in computer science at the University of Colorado in 1986.

Hudson has published over 150 papers and is the 17th most prolific author in the field. He is the most published author at the prestigious ACM UIST conference. He was elected to the CHI Academy in 2006, and regularly serves on the ACM SIGCHI and UIST conference program committees.  He is also a founding associate editor for ACM Transactions on Computer-Human Interaction.  Hudson was the first and founding director of the PhD program in Human-Computer Interaction at Carnegie Mellon University.

Along with Robert Xiao and Chris Harrison, colleagues at CMU, he developed Lumitrack, a motion tracking technology which is currently used in video game controllers and in the film industry.

References

External links
Scott Hudson's website
Human-Computer Interaction Institute

American computer scientists
Human–computer interaction researchers
Living people
Human-Computer Interaction Institute faculty
Georgia Tech faculty
University of Arizona faculty
University of Colorado alumni
Year of birth missing (living people)